MS Cruise Barcelona is a cruiseferry owned and operated by Grimaldi Lines. It was built at Fincantieri in Castellammare di Stabia, Italy.

She was the second of a series of four sister ships, the others being Cruise Roma (also operated by Grimaldi Lines), Cruise Europa and Cruise Olympia (operated by Minoan Lines). They are the largest ferries under Italian flag.

The ship can carry 3500 passengers and about 215 cars.

Cruise Barcelona, together with sister Cruise Roma, is operated on the Civitavecchia-Porto Torres-Barcelona route, sailing twice a week in winter and five times per week in summer.

On 13–14 January 2012 Cruise Barcelona was involved in the rescue operation following the Costa Concordia disaster.

The ferry was lengthened to 254 meters in 2019.

See also
Largest ferries of Europe

References

External links
 

Ferries of Italy
Cruiseferries
Ships built in Castellammare di Stabia
2008 ships
Ships built by Fincantieri

it:Cruise Barcelona